Alfredo Quiñones-Hinojosa  (also known as "Dr. Q") is a Mexican-American neurosurgeon, author, and researcher.  Currently, he is the  William J. and Charles H. Mayo Professor and Chair of Neurologic Surgery and runs a basic science research lab at the Mayo Clinic Jacksonville in Florida. 

He is an editorial board member and reviewer for several publications. Most notably, he is the editor-in-chief for Schmidek and Sweet Operative Neurosurgical Techniques (6th edition). He is also one of the editors for Controversies in Neuro-Oncology: Best Evidence Medicine for Brain Tumor Surgery, which was awarded first prize by the British Medical Association. He is co-founder and serves as president of Mission: BRAIN, Bridging Resources and Advancing International Neurosurgery, a 501(c)(3) nonprofit foundation.

He has published an autobiography, Becoming Dr. Q, about his journey from migrant farm worker to neurosurgeon, and recently Disney with Plan B Entertainment productions announced that his life story is going to be featured in a movie.

Early life 
Quiñones was born in Mexicali, Baja California, México.  In 1987, at the age of 19, Quiñones-Hinojosa went to the United States. Once arriving in the United States, Quiñones could not speak English and worked on farms outside of Fresno, California. As a farm hand, he saved enough money to take English classes.

Education 
Quiñones-Hinojosa started his education at San Joaquin Delta College in Stockton, California. He completed his bachelor's degree in psychology with the highest honors at University of California, Berkeley. He then went on to receive his medical degree from Harvard Medical School, where he graduated with honors. He also became a US citizen during this time. He then completed his residency in neurosurgery at the University of California, San Francisco, where he also completed a postdoctoral fellowship in developmental and stem cell biology at the laboratory of Professor Arturo Alvarez-Buylla.

Professional career 
Quiñones began his career at Johns Hopkins School of Medicine, where he became a Professor of Neurosurgery and Oncology, Neurology, and Cellular and Molecular Medicine and director of the Brain Tumor Stem Cell Biology Lab. 
Quiñones conducts both clinical and basic science research. From 2005 to 2016, his team published over 150 scientific articles and received 14 funding grants. Quiñones conducts numerous research efforts on elucidating the role of stem cells in the origin of brain tumors, and the potential role stem cells can play in fighting brain cancer and regaining neurological function. He has been actively involved in fundraisers for brain cancer research.  He continues to participate at half-marathons with his research team and some of his own patients to raise money for cancer research.

Books 
Quiñones is the author of more than 50 book chapters, and has authored several textbooks on neurosurgical techniques and stem cell biology. In 2011, Quiñones edited Core Techniques in Operative Neurosurgery  and published his autobiography, Becoming Dr Q: My Journey from Migrant Farm Worker to Brain Surgeon, which went on to earn him an International Latino Book Award in 2012. In 2012, Quiñones was the lead editor of the 6th edition of Schmidek and Sweet's Operative Neurosurgical Techniques, one of the world's preeminent textbooks of neurosurgery. He will also serve as the lead editor for the 7th edition of Schmidek and Sweet's Operative Neurosurgical Techniques. In 2013, Quiñones published Controversies in Neuro-Oncology: Best Evidence Medicine for Brain Tumor Surgery with Dr. Shaan Raza. The British Medical Association awarded Controversies in Neuro-Oncology first prize in Oncology in 2014. Quiñones is currently working on a first Video-Atlas of Neurosurgery that will be published in 2016.

Awards and recognitions 

 1986 B.A. Escuela Normal Urbana Federal Fronteriza, Mexicali, Mexico - Social Sciences and Humanities, Multidisciplinary teaching license
 1991 San Joaquin Delta Community College, Stockton, California - Transfer core curriculum to the University of California
 1994 B.A. University of California, Berkeley, California - Highest Honors
 1999 M.D. Harvard Medical School, Boston, Massachusetts - Cum Laude
 2000 University of California, San Francisco, California (General Surgery) - Most Valuable Intern Award
 2004 University of California, San Francisco, California (Residency - Neurosurgery) - Howard Naffziger Neurological Surgery Award
 2006 Howard Hughes Institute - Physician-Scientist Career Award
 2006 Association of American Medical Colleges - Herbert Nickens Award
 2006 American Society of Clinical Oncology Foundation - Career Development Award
 2006 American College of Surgeon - Franklin Martin Faculty Research Award
 2006 Johns Hopkins University - Passano Physician Scientist Award
 2007 Johns Hopkins Hospital - Department of Neurosurgery - Faculty Teaching Award (Richard J. Otenasek)
 2007 Robert Wood Johnson Award
 2007 Popular Science Magazine - Brilliant 10 Scientists Award
 2007 Baltimore Magazine - US Top Docs
 2008 Olender Foundation - America's Role Model Award
 2010 Science & Engineering Festival - Nifty Fifty Scientist
 2011 Baltimore Magazine - Baltimore Top Docs
 2012 Named as Super Doctor
 2012 Recipient of Ohtli Award
 2015 VII Premio Iberoamericano Cortes de Cádiz Surgery Award, Spain
 2015 Forbes, World's Most Creative Mexicans
 2018 Doctorate honoris cause, by University of Santander - UDES - Bucaramanga, COLOMBIA

Television
Dr Q’s story was featured in ‘Hopkins’. 
Quiñones stars in the second episode of The Surgeon's Cut, produced by BBC Studios’ The Science Unit for Netflix which was released globally on 9th of December 2020.

In the Immigration episode of Adam Ruins Everything, Quiñones-Hinojosa's name and picture (wearing a hat that says "Dr. Q" on it,) is featured in a lineup of some of the Mexican-American immigrants who have improved the United States.

References

External links 

 The New Website of Dr Alfredo Quinones-Hinojosa, May 2012
 All the videos of Dr Quinones-Hinojosa, May 2012
 "Becoming Dr. Q: My Journey from Migrant Farm Worker to Brain Surgeon" - book excerpt
Alfredo Quiñones-Hinojosa Short Talk: "How I Became a Scientist"
Alfredo Quiñones-Hinojosa's Seminar: "Brain Tumors and Stem Cells"
 An 'American' Success Story, May 19, 2007
 The Amazing Doctor Q, February 11, 2009
 Once a migrant worker, today he’s a brain surgeon, updated 7/23/2008 9:51:16 AM ET
 From Farmhand to Brain Surgeon Posted 07.01.08
 The American Dream: Dr. Quiñones' Incredible Journey, June 26, 2008
 
 C-SPAN Q&A interview with Quinones-Hinojosa, October 16, 2011

Living people
Mexican emigrants to the United States
San Joaquin Delta College alumni
University of California, Berkeley alumni
Harvard Medical School alumni
University of California, San Francisco alumni
Johns Hopkins University faculty
American neurosurgeons
American neuroscientists
1968 births
Physicians of the Mayo Clinic
Hispanic and Latino American scientists
Hispanic and Latino American physicians
21st-century American scientists
21st-century American physicians
American academics of Mexican descent
Ohtli Award winners